Yanhe Tujia Autonomous County is a county in the northeast of Guizhou province, China, bordering Chongqing to the north. It is under the administration of the prefecture-level city of Tongren.

Climate

References

 
County-level divisions of Guizhou
Tujia autonomous counties